Bedellia yasumatsui is a moth in the Bedelliidae family. It is known from Australia and Papua New Guinea.

The larvae have been recorded on Ipomoea species. They mine the leaves of their host plant.

External links
Reducing pest and disease impact on yield in selected Papua New Guinea sweet potato production systems

Bedelliidae